Kamsack Airport  is located adjacent to Kamsack, Saskatchewan, Canada.

See also 
List of airports in Saskatchewan

References

External links
 Town of Kamsack Airport Website

Registered aerodromes in Saskatchewan